Washington Township is one of fifteen townships in Greene County, Indiana, USA.  As of the 2010 census, its population was 1,186.

Geography
Lakes in this township include Long Pond. The stream of Fourmile Creek runs through this township.

Cities and towns
 Lyons

Unincorporated towns
 Beehunter
 Bushrod
 Ilene
 Plummer
 Stalcup Corner
(This list is based on USGS data and may include former settlements.)

Adjacent townships
 Fairplay Township (northeast)
 Richland Township (northeast)
 Taylor Township (east)
 Cass Township (southeast)
 Vigo Township, Knox County (southwest)
 Stafford Township (west)
 Grant Township (northwest)
 Stockton Township (northwest)

Cemeteries
The township contains two cemeteries: Bogard and Mount Zion (Dog Island) and Marco.

Major highways

References

External links
 Indiana Township Association
 United Township Association of Indiana
 U.S. Board on Geographic Names (GNIS)
 United States Census Bureau cartographic boundary files

Townships in Greene County, Indiana
Bloomington metropolitan area, Indiana
Townships in Indiana